Jackson Peak is a peak, 1,255 m, standing 2 nautical miles (3.7 km) south of Sumrall Peak in the Cordiner Peaks, Pensacola Mountains in Antarctica. Mapped by United States Geological Survey (USGS) from surveys and U.S. Navy air photos, 1956–66. Named by Advisory Committee on Antarctic Names (US-ACAN) for Allen M. Jackson, aviation electronics technician, Ellsworth Station winter party, 1957.

Mountains of Queen Elizabeth Land
Pensacola Mountains